The Flugabwehrkanonenpanzer Gepard ("anti-aircraft-gun tank 'Cheetah, better known as the Flakpanzer Gepard) is an all-weather-capable German self-propelled anti-aircraft gun (SPAAG). It was developed in the 1960s, fielded in the 1970s, and has been upgraded several times with the latest electronics. It has been a cornerstone of the air defence of the German Army (Bundeswehr) and a number of other NATO countries. 

In Germany, the Gepard was phased out in late 2010 and replaced by the Wiesel 2 Ozelot Leichtes Flugabwehrsystem (LeFlaSys)  with four FIM-92 Stinger or LFK NG missile launchers. A variant with the  MANTIS gun system and LFK NG missiles, based on the GTK Boxer, was also considered.

The Gepard has seen combat in the Russo-Ukrainian War.

Technology and systems

The vehicle is based on the hull of the Leopard 1 tank with a large fully rotating turret carrying the armament—a pair of 35 mm Oerlikon KDA autocannons.

Chassis and propulsion
The Gepard is based on a slightly modified chassis of the Leopard 1 main battle tank, including the complete drive unit with a 37.4-liter 10-cylinder multi-fuel engine (type: MB 838 CaM 500) with two mechanical superchargers built by MTU Aero Engines. The V-engine with a cylinder angle of 90 degrees has 610 kW at 2200 RPM (830 PS) and consumes—depending on the surface and driving style—around 150 liters per 100 kilometers. To ensure a steady supply of oil, even in difficult terrain and under extreme skew, the engine is provided with a dry sump forced lubrication. Even the gearbox (type: 4 HP-250) from ZF Friedrichshafen and the exhaust system with fresh air admixture to reduce the infrared signature were taken from the Leopard 1 main battle tank.

The Gepard is equipped with a Daimler-Benz (type: OM 314) 4-cylinder diesel auxiliary engine for the energy supply system. This engine is on the front left of the vehicle, located where the Leopard 1 has an ammunition magazine. The engine, which has a 3.8 liter capacity, is designed as a multi-fuel engine and produces . It consumes between 10 and 20 liters per hour, depending on the operational status of the tank. 

The auxiliary engine is coupled with five generators to operate at different speeds: Two Metadyn machines in tandem with a flywheel (which is used to store energy during the acceleration and deceleration of the turret) for the power of the elevation and traverse drives, two 380 Hz three-phase generators with a capacity of 20 kVA for the ventilation, fire-control and radar systems, and a 300 A 28 volt direct current generator for the electrical system. The fuel capacity is 985 liters, which ensures a combined operating time of approximately 48 hours.

The chassis and the track were taken directly from the Leopard 1. It has torsion bar spring-mounted roadwheels with seven roadwheel pairs per side. They are connected to the torsion bars on swing arms, whose deflection is limited by volute springs. Drive is through the drive sprockets located at the rear. 

The rubber-mounted shocks were modified to achieve better stability during firing. The track is manufactured by the company Diehl, rubber track pads fitted, and is "live" track with rubber bushings between the track links and pins (type: D 640 A). Grouser/icecleats can replace the rubber pads on some track links to increase traction on slippery surfaces.

The hull only had slight modifications, i.e. a modified roadwheel distance (8 cm increased distance between the third and fourth roadwheel) and the transfer of additional batteries in battery boxes at the rear. The batteries and the electrical system operate at 24 volts DC.

Turret

The electrically driven turret is powered by a 40 kW generator driven by a 4-cylinder, 3.8 litre Mercedes-Benz OM 314 multi-fuel engine that is placed in the front of the hull to the left of the driver. It also powers the radars and the fire-finding system.

Radar and laser
The Gepard has two radar dishes: a general search radar at the rear of the turret and a tracking radar at the front between the guns. Some are equipped with a laser rangefinder on top of the tracking radar.

Guns

The ammunition is 35×228mm calibre (STANAG 4516).

The KDA autocannon has a dual belt feed for two different ammunition types; the usual loading per gun is 320 AA rounds fed from inside the turret and 20 AP rounds fed from a small outlying storage. 

Each gun has a firing rate of 550 rounds/min. The combined rate of fire is 1,100 rounds/min, which – in unlimited mode – gives a continuous fire time of 35 seconds before running out of ammunition (with 640 AA rounds for both guns). It is standard to fire bursts against air targets, 24 rounds per gun for a total of 48 in limited mode and 48 rounds per gun for a total of 96 in normal mode. The 40 armour-piercing rounds are normally fired singly with the guns alternating; they are intended for self defence against light armoured ground targets.

Developmental history

The Gepard was developed from 1963 onward. In 1969, construction began of four A prototypes testing both 30 and 35 mm guns. In June 1970, it was decided to use the 35 mm type. In 1971, twelve second phase B prototypes were ordered. In 1971 the Dutch army ordered a CA preseries of five vehicles based on a parallel development that had used a West German 0-series Leopard 1 vehicle made available by the West German government in March 1970 as the C-prototype. 

The Germans made a small preseries of both the B1 and B2R. In February 1973, the political decision was made to produce the type. In September 1973 the contract was signed with Krauss-Maffei for 432 B2 turrets and 420 hulls with a total value of DM 1,200,000,000. Each vehicle would be about three times the price of a normal Leopard 1. The first was delivered in December 1976. Belgium ordered 55 vehicles, which were identical to the German version. The Netherlands ordered 95 vehicles, split into three batches (CA1, CA2 and CA3), which were equipped with Philips radar systems.

Since the 1980s, Redeye and later Stinger MANPADS teams have been accompanying the Gepard units to take advantage of their long-range scanning capacity. To combine this capacity in a single unit, a missile system upgrade that mounts the Stingers in twin packs to the autocannons was developed. The system was tested by the German Bundeswehr but not bought due to budget restrictions. Instead, the Ozelot Light Air Defence System (LeFlaSys) was fielded for the three Airborne Brigades.

Variants
There are two variants of Gepard in service; the Dutch variant has a different radar installation.

Search radar: S band, 15 km range
Tracking radar: Ku band, 15 km range
Laser rangefinder

Search radar: X band, 15 km range
Tracking radar: X/Ka band, 13 km range

Operational history

Invasion of Ukraine
The Gepard has been deployed by Ukraine in its defense against the 2022 Russian invasion of Ukraine. The first three Gepards arrived in Ukraine on 25 July 2022. A test showed that a supply of ammunition manufactured in Norway could not be fired by the Gepard, with a subsequent test of improved ammunition scheduled for August 2022. By 20 September 2022 thirty Gepards and 6,000 rounds had been delivered. According to Ukraine's Armed Forces about 50,000 Norwegian made rounds for the Gepard had been received by 26 September 2022. Photos from the German tabloid  of the Gepard with a Ukrainian crew include high-explosive incendiary (HEI) rounds (where the projectile is yellow with a red band) made by e.g. Norwegian Nammo. 

According to a Ukrainian defense attache in the United States the Gepard has been used to "great effect" against the "relatively crude" loitering munition believed to be Iranian-made Shahed-136. The Conflict Intelligence Team considers it likely that a Gepard destroyed a Russian Kh-101 cruise missile as it was targeting a Kyiv power plant on 18 October 2022. One unit is credited with destroying more than ten Shahed-136 drones and two cruise missiles. Such systems are more effective and hence more cost-effective than more advanced and expensive air defence systems such NASAMS or IRIS-T missiles, while being less politically sensitive as they only have a limited effective range. The  London-based think tank, the Royal United Services Institute (RUSI) wrote: "In general, gun systems are preferred over missiles where possible due to the much lower cost per engagement and higher availability of ammunition compared with SAMs and MANPADS".

On 2 December, Germany recovered seven additional Gepard tanks from the "scrap pile" to be refurbished and sent to Ukraine, bringing the total units sent to Ukraine at 37. They will arrive in spring 2023. Obtaining ammunition is difficult as Switzerland claims that owing to its neutrality it should forbid Germany to transfer its stock, and refuse to supply its surplus, forcing Germany to rely on other sources for ammunition. However, on 15 December Rheinmetall committed to a new factory in Germany to sidestep the Swiss re-export ban. A deal to start production was signed in February 2023.

One of the Gepards downed 10 Shaheds in a single engagement. RUSI noted that the Gepards were particularly effective against the drones.

Operators

Current operators
 : 36 surplus from Bundeswehr.
 : 60 have been received from retired Dutch surplus for 21 million dollars.
 : In December 2020, it was announced that a license had been issued for the export of a total of 15 Gepard anti-aircraft vehicles to Qatar. Furthermore, four automatic cannons, 30 barrels, 16,000 rounds of ammunition and 45 breechblocks will be delivered as spare parts. These were purchased in order to ensure air security for the 2022 FIFA World Cup. In early 2023, German government officials began negotiating with Qatar the possible purchase of their 15 Gepards to send these to Ukraine.
 : 43 delivered (36 + 7 for spares), all ex-Bundeswehr stocks.
 : On 26 April 2022, the German government authorized Krauss-Maffei Wegmann to transfer 50 refurbished Flakpanzer Gepard anti-aircraft vehicles to Ukraine. The first three Gepards arrived in Ukraine on 25 July 2022. By February 2023, 32 Gepards had been delivered, with an additional 5 still being prepared.

Former operators
 : 55 delivered, withdrawn from service and sold to private companies. 38 are currently owned and stored for resale in Belgium by OIP Land Systems.
 : Former user. Four vehicles delivered in 2008, and returned in January 2011. Equipment originally operated by the Bundeswehr. Order of 30 vehicles canceled due to high overhaul/upgrade costs.
 : 420 originally built for the Bundeswehr (195 B2 and 225 B2L with additional laser range finder). During the 1980s they equipped the anti-aircraft artillery regiments of the eleven German mechanized divisions with six batteries each and one additional corps level battalion with three batteries for a total of 69 batteries of six Gepard each. About 220 B2L were later modernised to Gepard 1A2 and equipped five active and the same number of reserve battalions of three batteries with seven Gepard each. This number was further reduced with the planned fielding of MANTIS and the change in military strategy to out-of-area missions. The last 94 of these remained in service until 2010 when they were gradually phased out until 2012 due to high maintenance costs. Many of Germany's retired Gepards remain in outdoor storage with KMT's subsidiary Battle Tank Dismantling GmbH Koch in Rockensußra, Thuringia. In light of the 2022 Russian invasion of Ukraine and Switzerland's refusal to supply ammunition for the Gepard, Germany announced on 14 February 2023 it would restart domestic production of ammunition for the Gepard through Rheinmetall.
 : 95 delivered, withdrawn from service and placed in storage as of 2006; 60 sold to Jordan in 2013.

Comparable systems

 Fliegerabwehrpanzer 68
 K30 Biho
 Korkut
 M247 Sergeant York
 Marksman anti-aircraft system
 PZA Loara
 Tunguska-M1
 Type 87 self-propelled anti-aircraft gun
 Type 95 SPAAA
 ZSU-23-4 Shilka
CV9040 LvKv90

References

External links
 
 Gepard Photos and Walk Arounds on Prime Portal
 Gepard at Army Technology
 Gepard at GlobalSecurity.org
 Gepard  at Defence Journal

35 mm artillery
Armoured fighting vehicles of Germany
Cold War military vehicles of Germany
Military vehicles introduced in the 1970s
Self-propelled anti-aircraft weapons